Rolamite is a technology for very low friction bearings developed by Sandia National Laboratories in the 1960s. It is the only elementary machine discovered in the twentieth century and can be used in various ways such as a component in switches, thermostats, valves, pumps, and clutches, among others.

Development
The Rolamite was invented by Sandia engineer Donald F. Wilkes and was patented on June 24, 1969. It was invented while Wilkes was working on a miniature device to detect small changes in the inertia of a small mass. After testing an S-shaped metal foil, which he found to be unstable to support surfaces, the engineer inserted rollers into the S-shaped bends of the band, producing a mechanical assembly that has very low friction in one direction and high stiffness transversely. It became known as Rolamite. 

The Rolamite uses a stressed metal band and counter-rotating rollers within an enclosure to create a linear bearing device that loses very little energy to friction. One source claims it is the only basic mechanical invention of the 20th century. Tests by Sandia indicated that Rolamite mechanisms demonstrated friction coefficients as low as 0.0005, an order of magnitude better than ball bearings at the time. There are known Rolamite versions that contain two bands that work in reciprocate parallel for more accurate kinematic transmission at the reverse motion.

A video of a Rolamite in operation, to serve as a warhead safety-switch accelerometer, is available.

See also
Scrollerwheel

References

Linear

 
Bishop,James E., (11/27/1973). "Remember the Rolamite? World's 27th-and Newest-'Elementary Mechanism' Still Works, but It Hasn't Revolutionized Technology" The Wall Street Journal Page 46.

Rotary

External links 
Compilation of Rolamite information and articles Including pictures and applications.

Linear
 Video of a homemade rolamite

Rotary
U.S. Patent #5,462,363

Simple machines
Bearings (mechanical)